Elections to Peterborough City Council took place on 5 May 2022. 19 of the 60 seats were contested. The election will took place alongside other local elections across the United Kingdom.

Current political makeup 

 Conservative: 7 defences (21 other seats)
 Labour and Co-operative: 5 defences (11 other seats)
 Liberal Democrat: 4 defences (4 other seats)
 Werrington First: 1 defence (2 other seats)
 Green: 1 defence (2 other seats)
 Independent Labour: 1 defence  (0 other seats)
 Independent: 0 defences (1 other seat)

Summary

Ward results

Bretton 

This seat was last contested in 2021. The incumbent was Scott Warren (Conservative). 

UKIP (3.4%) and For Britain Movement (3.9%) did not contest this time.

Central 

This seat was last contested in 2021. The incumbent (Mahboob Hussain, Labour) did not seek re-election.

Freedom Alliance (2.5%) did not contest this time.

Dogsthorpe 

This seat was last contested in 2021. The incumbent was Dennis Jones (Labour).

Independent Colin Hargreaves (11.4%) and UKIP (4.0%) did not contest this time.

East 

This seat was last contested in 2021. The incumbent was Sam Hemraj (Labour).

Eye, Thorney & Newborough 

This seat was last contested in 2021. The incumbent (Richard Brown, Conservative) did not seek re-election.

Fletton & Stanground 

One vacant seat was up for election ([Liberal Democrat), alongside the incumbent (Christian Hogg, Liberal Democrat).

This seat was last contested in 2021.

The Green Party (7.2%) and John Whitby (Independent) (10.6%) did not contest this time.

Fletton & Woodston 

This seat was last contested in 2021. The incumbent was Alan Dowson (Labour).

Freedom Alliance (2.7%) did not contest this time.

Gunthorpe 

This seat was last contested in 2021. The incumbent was Andrew Bond (Liberal Democrat).

Christian Peoples Alliance (1.3%) did not contest this time.

Hampton Vale 

This seat was last contested in 2021. The incumbent was Marco Cereste (Conservative).

Dave King (Independent) (4.8%) did not contest this time.

Hargate & Hempsted 

This seat was last contested in 2021. The incumbent was Mohammed Farooq (Conservative).

North 

This seat was last contested in 2018. The incumbent (Shazia Bashir, Conservative) is not seeking re-election in this ward.

UKIP (4.8%), The Green Party (4.7%) and the Lib Dems (4.2%) are not contesting this time.

Orton Longueville 

This seat was last contested in 2018. The incumbent (Irene Walsh, Conservative) is not seeking re-election in this ward.

UKIP (14.4%) are not contesting this time.

Orton Waterville 

This seat was last contested in 2018. The incumbent is Julie Howell (Green).

A month after contesting the seat, Stevenson (née Howell) resigned from the Green Party to sit as an independent.

Park 

This seat was last contested in 2018. The incumbent (Aasiyah Joseph, Labour) is not seeking re-election.

Paston & Walton 

This seat was last contested in 2018. The incumbent is Asif Shaheed (Liberal Democrat).

UKIP (8.1%) did not contest this time.

Ravensthorpe 

This seat was last contested in 2018. The incumbent, Ed Murphy, was suspended by the Labour Party in 2021. He contested this election as an independent candidate.

UKIP (6.5%) and The Green Party (3%) did not contest this time.

Stanground South 

This seat was last contested in 2018. The incumbent is Ray Bisby (Conservative).

UKIP (5%), Julian Bray (Independent) (4.5%), and The Liberal Democrats (4.3%) did not contest this time.

Werrington 

This seat was last contested in 2018. The incumbent is Steve Lane (Werrington First).

UKIP (2.9%) did not contest this time.

References 

Peterborough City Council elections
2020s in Cambridgeshire
Peterborough